Samuel Beryl Ralston (August 3, 1885 – August 29, 1950) was an outfielder in Major League Baseball. He played for the Washington Senators in 1910.

References

External links

1885 births
1950 deaths
Major League Baseball outfielders
Washington Senators (1901–1960) players
Akron Champs players
Baseball players from Ohio
Pittsburgh Panthers baseball players
Wheeling Stogies players
New Castle Nocks players
St. Paul Saints (AA) players
Columbus Senators players
Milwaukee Brewers (minor league) players
People from Ashtabula County, Ohio